Star Driver also known as  is a Japanese anime television series created and animated by Bones. It was broadcast for twenty-five episodes on MBS and TBS from October 2010 to April 2011. The anime was licensed in North America by Aniplex of America and was streamed with English subtitles on Hulu, Crackle and Crunchyroll. A compilation film was released on February 9, 2013 in Japan by Shochiku.

Plot

Star Driver takes place on the fictional Southern Cross Isle. One night, a boy named Takuto washes up on shore swimming from the mainland. He later enrolls in Southern Cross High School as a freshman and makes new friends. However, beneath the school is a group of mysterious giants called Cybodies, which can be controlled by humans in an alternate dimension known as Zero Time.

Media

Anime

The series is directed by Takuya Igarashi, with character designs by Yoshiyuki Ito and Hiroka and Misa Mizuya. The anime premiered on October 3, 2010 and ended on April 3, 2011.  The series was collected by Aniplex in a total of nine DVD and Blu-ray volumes. A Blu-ray box was also released on January 23, 2013.

In North America, Aniplex of America premiered the first episode at the 2010 New York Comic Con/New York Anime Festival on October 9, 2010. Bandai Entertainment formerly licensed the series in 2011. The series was streamed with English subtitles by Aniplex of America on Hulu, Crackle, and Crunchyroll starting on August 17, 2011.

Music
Opening themes
"Gravity Ø" by Aqua Timez (1-13)
"Shining☆Star" by 9nine (14-24)
Ending themes
"Cross Over" by 9nine (1-13)
"Pride" by Scandal (14-25)
Insert Maiden songs
"First Galaxy" by Takuto Tsunashi (Mamoru Miyano)
 by Sakana-chan (Haruka Tomatsu)
 by Wako Agemaki (Saori Hayami)
 by Mizuno Yō (Rina Hidaka)
 by Nichi Keito (Ami Koshimizu)

Manga
A manga adaptation, illustrated by Key by Ylab, was serialized in Square Enix's Young Gangan from September 17, 2010, to December 2, 2011. Square Enix collected its chapters in three tankōbon volumes, released from February 26, 2011, to January 25, 2012.

References

External links
 
 

2010 Japanese television series debuts
2011 Japanese television series endings
2013 anime films
Action anime and manga
Anime with original screenplays
Aniplex
Bandai Entertainment anime titles
Bones (studio)
Films based on television series
Films directed by Takuya Igarashi
Gangan Comics manga
Japanese-language films
Mainichi Broadcasting System original programming
Seinen manga
Super robot anime and manga
TBS Television (Japan) original programming